Pokémon Adventures, known in Japan as , is a Japanese manga series published by Shogakukan. The story arcs of the series are based on most of the Pokémon video games released by Nintendo and, as such, the main characters of the series have the name of their video game. Since the manga is based on the video games, there are some delays with the serialization since the authors need to have seen the games in order to continue with the plot.

Overview
The series is written by Hidenori Kusaka. It was illustrated by Mato during the first nine volumes, while Satoshi Yamamoto started illustrating it since the tenth volume. The Japanese publisher Shogakukan has been releasing the individual chapters in tankōbon format with the first one being released on August 8, 1997, and currently, 64 tankōbon have been released.

The distributing company Viz Media has licensed the series for English in the United States. Viz released the first seven volumes of the series in tankōbon format from July 6, 2000 to January 2003 as well as in magazine format. During 2006 they released two volumes with the name The Best of Pokémon Adventures, which are various chapters from the first two arcs put into one book. On June 1, 2009, Viz restarted publishing the tankōbon volumes, and also localized the later arcs after the first 7 volumes. Volume 8, the start of the Gold and Silver arc, released in 2010, and Volume 30, the start of the DP arc (known as volume 1 of Diamond/Pearl/Platinum in Viz's release) was released in 2011. However, these releases feature both visual and dialogue edits not found in the original English release and original Japanese tankobon release.

On July 24, 2018, Viz announced their plans to release the regular volume releases digitally on their digital platform, as well as the digital platforms of their associates such as ComiXology and Amazon Kindle with the first seven volumes available initially and the remaining sagas planned for release between August to December 2018.

Volume list

Volumes 1–20

Volumes 21–40

Volumes 41–current

References

External links
 Official Pokémon Adventures website of Viz Media
 Official Pokémon Adventures website 

Adventures